Nicholas James Mullen (born December 13, 1988) is an American stand-up comedian, podcaster, and comedy writer. Active since 2005, he is best known as the creator and co-host of the comedy podcast Cum Town (2016–2022) and its successor The Adam Friedland Show (2022–present). His comedy is ironic, observational and self-deprecating, and often focuses on internet culture.

Career 
Originally from Montgomery County, Maryland, he began performing in the Washington-Baltimore Metropolitan Area as a teenager, often at Wiseacres Comedy Club in Virginia. Many of his comedic anecdotes draw from a string of service industry jobs he held at this time. During his early twenties, he was based out of Austin, Texas (and briefly Los Angeles).

A nationally touring stand-up, he was an opener for acts including Dana Gould, Jim Norton, Patrice O'Neal, and Hannibal Buress. In 2010, he was named "Best of Fest" at the Laugh Detroit festival. In 2012, he performed at SXSW as part of the Made in Austin and Weekend Spotlight comedy showcases. That same year, he was named one of the New Faces Unrepped by Montreal's Just for Laughs festival. Other festivals include the 2014 Bentzen Ball in Washington, D.C.

From 2013 to 2015, he wrote a popular ironic parody blog under the heteronym Nicole Mullen on Thought Catalog. The blog featured satirical articles with titles like "Read This If Your Child Was Eaten By A Pelican", "Wape Jokes Awen’t Funny, And Neither Is My Speech Impediment", and "Can We Stop Pretending Like Abortions Don’t Feel Good?", which was read by Alex Jones on his show InfoWars under the assumption that it was a genuine article. He also had a prank call podcast called Help Me, I'm Old.

In the mid-2010s, Mullen moved to New York City. Prior to Cum Town, he had multiple TV and radio appearances. During the late 2010s, he was a recurring guest on the Real Ass Podcast, Race Wars (hosted by Kurt Metzger and Sherrod Smalls), and Legion of Skanks. His writing credits include Comedy Knockout on TruTV (premiered 2016), Make Me Understand with Jim Norton (2016 IFC television pilot), and 2017's Problematic with Moshe Kasher (Comedy Central). Additionally, he made appearances on Red Eye as a guest panelist.

From 2016 until its end in 2022, Mullen was a co-host of the popular comedy podcast Cum Town. On June 29, 2022, Mullen and Adam Friedland released the first episode of The Adam Friedland Show, a successor to Cum Town, after co-host Stavros Halkias left the show. The show is hosted by Friedland and produced and co-hosted by Mullen.

Personal life 
Mullen lives in Brooklyn, New York. He previously lived in Manhattan's Chinatown; some of his comedic anecdotes draw from his experience living there. Nick is originally from Maryland.

References

External links 
 

1988 births
Living people
21st-century American comedians
American comedy writers
American male comedians
American male television writers
American podcasters
American people of Irish descent
American stand-up comedians
Comedians from New York City